This article lists which other significant offices have been held by the Prime Minister of the United Kingdom before and after they have come to power as Prime Minister. The positions and amount of experience a prime minister has acquired has changed over the years, with modern prime ministers having gained experience through leading the opposition, while earlier prime ministers would be more likely to have held roles within the government. Usually a prime minister does not hold high office again after leaving the role. However, there are some cases where individuals have gone on to hold senior roles in future administrations.

Prime ministers

Robert Walpole
Secretaries at war 1708-1710
Treasurer of the Navy 1710-1711
Paymaster of the Forces 1714-1715
Chancellor of the Exchequer 1715-1717
Paymaster of the Forces 1720-1721
Chancellor of the Exchequer 1721-1742
Prime Minister 1721-1742

Spencer Compton, 1st Earl of Wilmington
Paymaster of Pensions 1707-1713
Speaker of the House of Commons 1715-1727
Paymaster of the Forces 1722-1730
Lord President of the Council 1730-1742
Prime Minister 1742-1743

Henry Pelham
Secretaries at war 1724-1730
Paymaster of the Forces 1730-1743
Chancellor of the Exchequer 1743-1754
Prime Minister 1743-1754

Thomas Pelham-Holles, 1st Duke of Newcastle
Lord Chamberlain 1717-1724
Secretary of State for the Southern Department 1724-1748
Secretary of State for the Northern Department 1748-1754
Prime Minister 1754-1756
Prime Minister 1757-1762
Lord Privy Seal 1765-1766

William Cavendish, 4th Duke of Devonshire
Master of the Horse 1751-1755
Lord Lieutenant of Ireland 1755-1757
Prime Minister 1756-1757
Lord Chamberlain 1757-1762

John Stuart, 3rd Earl of Bute
Secretary of State for the Northern Department 1761-1762
Leader of the House of Lords 1762-1763
Prime Minister 1762-1763

George Grenville
Treasurer of the Navy 1754-1756
Treasurer of the Navy 1756-1762
Secretary of State for the Northern Department 1962
Chancellor of the Exchequer 1763-1765
Prime Minister 1763-1765

Charles Watson-Wentworth, 2nd Marquess of Rockingham
Lord of the Bedchamber 1751-1760
Lord Lieutenant of Yorkshire 1751-1763
Lord of the Bedchamber 1760-1762
Lord Lieutenant of Yorkshire 1765-1782
Prime Minister 1765-1766
Prime Minister 1782

William Pitt the Elder
Paymaster of the Forces 1746-1755
Leader of the House of Commons 1756-1757
Secretary of State for the Southern Department 1756-1757
Leader of the House of Commons 1757-1761
Secretary of State for the Southern Department 1757-1761
Prime Minister 1766-1768

Augustus Fitzroy, 3rd Duke of Grafton
Secretary of State for the Northern Department 1765-1766
Prime Minister 1768-1770
Lord Privy Seal 1771-1775
Lord Privy Seal 1782-1783

Frederick North, Lord North
Chancellor of the Exchequer 1767-1782
Leader of the House of Commons 1768-1782
Prime Minister 1770-1782
Secretary of State for Home Affairs 1783
Leader of the House of Commons 1783

William Petty, 2nd Earl of Shelburne
First Lord of Trade 1763
Secretary of State for the Southern Department 1766-1768
Home Secretary 1782
Leader of the House of Commons 1782-1783
Prime Minister 1782-1783

William Cavendish-Bentinck, 3rd Duke of Portland
Lord Chamberlain 1765-1766
Lord Lieutenant of Ireland 1782
Prime Minister 1783
Home Secretary 1794-1801
Lord President of the Council 1801-1805
Prime Minister 1807-1809

William Pitt the Younger
Chancellor of the Exchequer 1782-1783
Leader of the House of Commons 1783-1801
Prime Minister 1783-1801
Chancellor of the Exchequer 1804-1806
Prime Minister 1804-1806

Henry Addington
Speaker of the House of Commons 1789-1801
Leader of the House of Commons 1801-1804
Prime Minister 1801-1804
Lord President of the Council 1805
Lord Privy Seal 1806
Lord President of the Council 1806-1807
Home Secretary 1812-1822

William Grenville
Paymaster of the Forces 1784-1789
Speaker of the House of Commons 1789
Home Secretary 1789-1791
Foreign Secretary 1791-1801
Prime Minister 1806-1807
Leader of the Opposition (House of Lords) 1807-1817

Spencer Perceval
Solicitor General of England Wales 1801-1802
Attorney General for England and Wales 1802-1806
Chancellor of the Duchy of Lancaster 1806-1807
Leader of the House of Commons 1807-1812
Chancellor of the Exchequer 1807-1812
Prime Minister 1809-1812

Robert Jenkinson, 2nd Earl of Liverpool
Master of the Mint 1799-1801
Foreign Secretary 1801-1804
Home Secretary 1804-1806
Home Secretary 1807-1809
Leader of the House of Lords 1807-1827
Secretary of State for War 1809-1812
Prime Minister 1812-1827

George Canning
Commissioner of the Board of Control for India 1799-1801
Treasury of the Navy 1804-1806
Foreign Secretary 1807-1809
President of the Board of Control 1816-1821
Foreign Secretary 1822-1827
Leader of the House of Commons 1822-1827
Chancellor of the Exchequer 1827
Prime Minister 1827

Frederick John Robinson, 1st Viscount Goderich
President of the Board of Trade 1818-1823
Chancellor of the Exchequer 1823-1827
Prime Minister 1827-1828
Colonial Office 1830-1833
Lord Privy Seal 1833-1834
President of the Board of Trade 1843-1846

Arthur Wellesley, 1st Duke of Wellington
Master General of the Ordnance 1819-1827
Commander-in-Chief of the Forces 1827-1828
Leader of the Opposition (House of Lords) 1827-1828
Leader of the House of Lords 1828-1830
Prime Minister 1828-1830
Leader of the Opposition (House of Lords) 1830-1834
Secretary of State for War 1834
Home Secretary 1834
Foreign Secretary 1834-1835
Leader of the House of Lords 1834-1835
Prime Minister 1834
Leader of the Opposition (House of Lords) 1835-1841
Leader of the House of Lords 1841-1846
Commander-in-Chief of the Forces 1842-1852

Charles Grey
First Lord of the Admiralty 1806
Leader of the House of Commons 1806-1807
Foreign Secretary 1806-1807
Leader of the Opposition (House of Lords) 1817-1821
Leader of the House of Lords 1830-1834
Prime Minister 1830-1834

William Lamb, 2nd Viscount Melbourne
Chief Secretary for Ireland 1827-1828
Home Secretary 1830-1834
Leader of the House of Lords 1834
Prime Minister 1834
Leader of the Opposition (House of Lords) 1835
Leader of the House of Lords 1841-42
Prime Minister 1835-1841

Robert Peel
Chief Secretary for Ireland 1812-1818
Home Secretary 1822-1827
Leader of the Opposition 1827-1828
Home Secretary 1828-1830
Leader of the Opposition 1830-1834
Prime Minister 1835
Chancellor of the Exchequer 1835
Leader of the Opposition 1835-1841
Prime Minister 1841-1846

John Russell
Paymaster of the Forces 1830-1834
Leader of the Opposition 1834-1835
Home Secretary 1835-1839
Secretary of State for War 1839-1841
Leader of the Opposition 1841-1846
Prime Minister 1846-1852
Leader of the Opposition 1852
Foreign Secretary 1852-1853
Lord President of the Council 1854-1855
Secretary of State for the Colonies 1855
Foreign Secretary 1859-1865
Prime Minister 1865-66
Leader of the Opposition (House of Lords) 1866-68

Edward Smith-Stanley, 14th Earl of Derby
Chief Secretary for Ireland 1830-1833
Secretary of State for War and the Colonies 1833-1834
Secretary of State for War and the Colonies 1841-1845
Prime Minister 1852
Leader of the Opposition (House of Lords) 1852-1858
Prime Minister 1858-1859
Leader of the Opposition (House of Lords) 1859-1866
Prime Minister 1866-1868

George Hamilton-Gordon, 4th Earl of Aberdeen
Chancellor of the Duchy of Lancaster 1828
Foreign Secretary 1828-1830
Secretary of State for War and Colonies 1834-1835
Foreign Secretary 1841-1846
Prime Minister 1852-1855

Henry John Temple, 3rd Viscount Palmerston
Secretary of War 1809-1828
Foreign Secretary 1830-1834
Foreign Secretary 1835-1841
Foreign Secretary 1846-1851
Home Secretary 1852-1855
Prime Minister 1855-1858
Leader of the Opposition 1858-1859
Prime Minister 1859-1865

Benjamin Disraeli
Leader of the Opposition 1849-1852
Leader of the House of Commons 1852
Chancellor of the Exchequer 1852
Leader of the Opposition 1852-1858
Leader of the House of Commons 1858-1859
Chancellor of the Exchequer 1858-1859
Leader of the Opposition 1859-1866
Leader of the House of Commons 1866-1868
Chancellor of the Exchequer 1866-1868
Prime Minister 1868
Leader of the Opposition 1868-1874
Prime Minister 1874-1880
Leader of the Opposition (House of Lords) 1880-1881

William Ewart Gladstone
President of the Board of Trade 1843-1845
Secretary of State for War and Colonies 1845-1846
Chancellor of the Exchequer 1852-1855
Chancellor of the Exchequer 1859-1866
Leader of the Opposition 1866-1868
Prime Minister 1868-1874
Chancellor of the Exchequer 1873-1874
Leader of the Opposition 1874-1875
Prime Minister 1880-1885
Leader of the Opposition 1885-1886
Prime Minister 1886
Leader of the Opposition 1886-1892
Chancellor of the Exchequer 1892-1894
Prime Minister 1892-1894

Robert Gascoyne-Cecil, 3rd Marquess of Salisbury
Secretary of State for India 1874-1878
Foreign Secretary 1878-1880
Leader of the Opposition (House of Lords) 1881-1885
Foreign Secretary 1885-1886
Prime Minister 1885-1886
Leader of the Opposition (House of Lords) 1886
Prime Minister 1886-1892
Foreign Secretary 1887-1892
Leader of the Opposition (House of Lords) 1892-1895
Foreign Secretary 1895-1900
Prime Minister 1895-1902
Lord Keeper of the Privy Seal 1900-1902

Archibald Primrose, 5th Earl of Rosebery
First Commissioner of Works 1885
Lord Keeper of the Privy Seal 1885
Foreign Secretary 1886
Foreign Secretary 1892-1894
Lord President of the Council 1894-1895
Prime Minister 1894-1895
Leader of the Opposition (House of Lords) 1895

Arthur Balfour
Secretary for Scotland 1886-1887
Chief Secretary for Ireland 1887-1891
Leader of the House of Commons 1891-1892
Leader of the Opposition 1892-1895
Leader of the House of Commons 1895-1905
Lord Keeper of the Privy Seal 1902-1903
Prime Minister 1902-1905
Leader of the Opposition 1905-1906
Leader of the Opposition 1906-1911
First Lord of the Admiralty 1915-1916
Foreign Secretary 1916-1919
Lord President of the Council 1919-1922
Lord President of the Council 1925-1929

Henry Campbell-Bannerman
Secretary to the Admiralty 1882-1884
Chief Secretary for Ireland 1884-1885
Secretary of State for War 1886
Secretary of State for War 1892-1895
Leader of the Opposition 1988-1905
Prime Minister 1905-1908

Herbert Henry Asquith
Home Secretary 1892-1895
Chancellor of the Exchequer 1905-1908
Prime Minister 1908-1916
Secretary of State for War 1914
Leader of the Opposition 1916-1918
Leader of the Opposition 1920-1922

David Lloyd George
President of the Board of Trade 1905-1908
Chancellor of the Exchequer 1908-1915
Minister of Munitions 1915-1916
Secretary of State for War 1916
Prime Minister 1916-1922

Bonar Law
Leader of the Opposition 1911-1915
Secretary of State for the Colonies 1915-1916
Leader of the House of Commons 1916-1921
Chancellor of the Exchequer 1916-1919
Lord Privy Seal 1919-1921
Leader of the House of Commons 1922-1923
Prime Minister 1922-1923

Stanley Baldwin
Financial Secretary to the Treasury 1917-1921
President of the Board of Trade 1921-1922
Chancellor of the Exchequer 1922-1923
Prime Minister 1923-1924
Leader of the Opposition 1924
Prime Minister 1924-1929
Leader of the Opposition 1929-1931
Lord President of the Council 1931-1935
Prime Minister 1935-1937

Ramsay MacDonald
Leader of the Opposition 1922-1924
Leader of the House of Commons 1924
Foreign Secretary 1924
Prime Minister 1924
Leader of the Opposition 1924-1929
Leader of the House of Commons 1929-1935
Prime Minister 1929-1935
Lord President of the Council 1935-1937

Neville Chamberlain
Postmaster General 1922-1923
Minister of Health 1923
Chancellor of the Exchequer 1923-1924
Minister of Health 1924-1929
Minister of Health 1931
Chancellor of the Exchequer 1931-1937
Prime Minister 1937-1940
Lord President of the Council 1940

Winston Churchill
President of the Board of Trade 1908-1910
Home Secretary 1910-1911
First Lord of the Admiralty 1911-1915
Minister of Munitions 1917-1919
Secretary of State for Air 1919-1921
Secretary of State for War 1919-1921
Secretary of State for the Colonies 1921-1922
Chancellor of the Exchequer 1924-1929
First Lord of the Admiralty 1939-1940
Minister of Defence 1940-1945
Prime Minister 1940-1945
Leader of the Opposition 1945-1951
Minister of Defence 1951-1952
Prime Minister 1951-1955

Clement Attlee
Chancellor of the Duchy of Lancaster 1931
Postmaster General 1931
Leader of the Opposition 1935-1940
Lord Keeper of the Privy Council 1940-1942
Secretary of State for Dominion Affairs 1942-1943
Deputy Prime Minister 1942-1945
Lord President of the Council 1943-1945
Leader of the Opposition 1945
Prime Minister 1945-1951
Leader of the Opposition 1951-1955

Anthony Eden
Lord Keeper of the Privy Seal 1933-1935
Foreign Secretary 1935-1938
Secretary of State for Dominion Affairs 1939-1940
Secretary of State for War 1940
Foreign Secretary 1940-1945
Leader of the House of Commons 1942-1945
Deputy Prime Minister 1951-1955
Foreign Secretary 1951-1955
Prime Minister 1955-1957

Harold Macmillan
Secretary of State for Air 1945
Minister of Housing 1951-1954
Minister of Defence 1954-1955
Foreign Secretary 1955
Chancellor of the Exchequer 1955-1957
Prime Minister 1957-1963

Alec Douglas-Home
Minister of State for Scotland 1951-1955
Secretary of State for the Commonwealth 1955-1960
Lord President of the Council 1957
Leader of the House of Lords 1957-1960
Lord President of the Council 1959-1960
Foreign Secretary 1960-1963
Prime Minister 1963-1964
Leader of the Opposition 1964-1965
Shadow Foreign Secretary 1972-1974
Foreign Secretary 1970-1974

Harold Wilson
Secretary for Overseas Trade 1947
President of the Board of Trade 1947-1951
Shadow Chancellor of the Exchequer 1955-1961
Shadow Foreign Secretary 1961-1963
Leader of the Opposition 1963-1964
Prime Minister 1964-1970
Leader of the Opposition 1970-1974
Prime Minister 1974-1976

Edward Heath
Chief Whip 1955-1959
Minister of Labour 1959-1960
Lord Privy Seal 1960-1963
President of the Board of Trade 1963-1964
Secretary of State for Industry 1963-1964
Shadow Chancellor of the Exchequer 1965
Leader of the Opposition 1965-1970
Prime Minister 1970-1974
Leader of the Opposition 1974-1975

James Callaghan
Shadow Chancellor of the Exchequer 1961-1964
Chancellor of the Exchequer 1964-1967
Home Secretary 1967-1970
Shadow Home Secretary 1970-1971
Shadow Foreign Secretary 1972-1974
Foreign Secretary 1974-1976
Prime Minister 1976-1979
Leader of the Opposition 1979-1980

Margaret Thatcher
Shadow Education Secretary 1967-1970
Education Secretary 1970-1974
Shadow Environment Secretary 1974-1975
Leader of the Opposition 1975-1979
Prime Minister 1979-1990

John Major
Minister of State for Social Security 1986-1987
Chief Secretary to the Treasury 1987-1989
Foreign Secretary 1989
Chancellor of the Exchequer 1989-1990
Prime Minister 1990-1997
Leader of the Opposition 1997
Shadow Foreign Secretary 1997

Tony Blair
Shadow Minister for Trade 1987-1988
Shadow Energy Secretary 1988-1989
Shadow Employment Secretary 1989-1992
Shadow Home Secretary 1992-1994
Leader of the Opposition 1994-1997
Prime Minister 1997-2007

Gordon Brown
Shadow Chief Secretary to the Treasury 1987-1989
Shadow Trade and Industry Secretary 1989-1992
Shadow Chancellor of the Exchequer 1992-1997
Chancellor of the Exchequer 1997-2007
Prime Minister 2007-2010

David Cameron
Conservative Policy Review Coordinator 2004-2005
Shadow Education and Skills Secretary 2005-2005
Leader of the Opposition 2005-2010
Prime Minister 2010-2016

Theresa May
Shadow Education and Employment Secretary 1998-2001
Shadow Women and Equality Minister 1998-2001
Shadow Transport Secretary 2001-2002
Chairman of the Conservative Party 2002-2003
Shadow Environment, Food and Rural Affairs Secretary 2003-2004
Shadow Transport Secretary 2003-2004
Shadow Family Secretary 2004-2005
Shadow Culture, Media and Sport Secretary 2005-2005
Shadow Leader of the House of Commons 2005-2009
Shadow Women and Equality Minister 2007-2010
Shadow Work and Pensions Secretary 2009-2010
Minister for Women and Equalities 2010-2012
Home Secretary 2010-2016
Prime Minister 2016-2019
Commonwealth Chair-in-Office 2018-2019

Boris Johnson
Mayor of London 2008-2016
Foreign Secretary 2016-2018
Leader of the Conservative Party 2019-2022
Commonwealth Chair-in-Office 2019-2022
Prime Minister 2019-2022
Minister for the Union 2019-2022

Liz Truss
Parliamentary Under-Secretary of State for Childcare and Education 2012-2014
Secretary of State for Environment, Food and Rural Affairs 2014-2016
Secretary of State for Justice 2016-2017
Lord Chancellor 2016-2017
Chief Secretary to the Treasury 2017-2019
Secretary of State for International Trade 2019-2021
President of the Board of Trade 2019-2021
Minister for Women and Equalities 2019-2022
Secretary of State for Foreign, Commonwealth and Development Affairs 2021-2022
Leader of the Conservative Party 2022
Minister for the Union 2022
Prime Minister 2022

Rishi Sunak
Parliamentary Under-Secretary of State for Local Government 2018-2019
Chief Secretary to the Treasury 2019-2020
Chancellor of the Exchequer 2020-2022
Leader of the Conservative Party 2022-present
Minister for the Union 2022-present
Prime Minister 2022-present

References

Further reading

United Kingdom
previous office